Taractrocera ceramas, commonly known as the Tamil grass dart, is a butterfly belonging to the family Hesperiidae. It is found from the Western Ghats to Mumbai, in the hills of southern India, in northeast India to northern Burma and in south-eastern China.

Description

Subspecies
 Taractrocera ceramas nicevillei Watson, 1893 (Maharashtra) 
 Taractrocera ceramas oberthuri Elwes & Edwards, 1897 (Anaimalai Hills, Tamil Nadu)
 Taractrocera ceramas atropunctata Watson, 1896 (north-eastern India, northern Burma) 
 Taractrocera ceramas ceramas (Nilgiris, Kerala, Tamil Nadu, part of Karnataka) 
 Taractrocera ceramas media Evans, 1934 (Uttara Kannada, Goa) 
 Taractrocera ceramas thelma Evans, 1934 (Kwang Si, China)

Gallery

References

Taractrocerini
Butterflies described in 1868
Butterflies of Asia
Taxa named by William Chapman Hewitson